The Los Angeles Film Critics Association (LAFCA) is an American film critic organization founded in 1975.

Background
Its membership comprises film critics from Los Angeles-based print and electronic media. In December of each year, the organization votes on the Los Angeles Film Critics Association Awards, honoring members of the film industry who have excelled in their fields over the calendar year. These awards are presented each January. The LAFCA also honors industry veterans with its annual Career Achievement Award, and promising talent with its annual New Generation Award.

Award ceremonies

Awards categories
 Best Animated Film
 Best Cinematography
 Best Director
 Best Documentary Film
 Best Editing
 Best Film
 Best Foreign Language Film
 Best Lead Performance
 Best Music
 Best Production Design
 Best Screenplay
 Best Supporting Performance
 New Generation Award
 Career Achievement Award

References

External links 

 
American film critics associations
Cinema of Southern California
Arts organizations based in California
Culture of Los Angeles
Mass media in Los Angeles
Organizations based in Los Angeles
1975 establishments in California
Arts organizations established in 1975